2005–06 Eerste Klasse was a Dutch association football season of the Eerste Klasse.

Saturday champions were:
A: SV Huizen
B: TOGR
C: SSV '65
D: VV Nunspeet
E: Oranje Nassau Groningen

Sunday champions were:
A: HVV Hollandia
B: VUC Den Haag
C: Blauw Geel '38
D: RKSV Groene Ster
E: SC Enschede
F: Meppeler Sport Club

Eerste Klasse seasons
4